Curson Lodge is a 15th century, Grade II* listed building at 45 and 45A St Nicholas Street in Ipswich. The rest of the mansion extended along the other side of Silent Street and Peter Street.

The building acquired the name "Curson Lodge" during this restoration because it was part of a complex of buildings comprising the mansion of Robert Curson, a Tudor courtier. The rest of the mansion extended along the other side of Silent Street and Saint Peter Street as far down as Rose Lane.

References

Grade II* listed buildings in Ipswich